Group consciousness may refer to:
 Collective consciousness, the set of shared beliefs, ideas and moral attitudes which operate as a unifying force within society.
Group consciousness (political science)
 Vijnanakaya, one of the seven Sarvāstivāda Abhidharma Buddhist scriptures.